This page shows the results of the Cycling Competition at the 1971 Pan American Games, held from July 30 to August 13, 1971 in Cali, Colombia. There were a total number of six events, with only men competing.

Men's competition

Men's 1.000m Match Sprint (Track)

Men's 1.000m Time Trial (Track)

Men's 4.000m Individual Pursuit (Track)

Men's 4.000m Team Pursuit (Track)

Men's Individual Race (Road)

Men's Team Time Trial (Road)

References
Results

1971
Pan American
1971 in road cycling
1971 in track cycling
International cycle races hosted by Colombia